Yemen competed at the 2012 Summer Olympics in London, from 27 July to 12 August 2012. This was the nation's sixth consecutive appearance at the Olympics since its reunification in 1990.

The Yemen Olympic Committee selected a team of four athletes, three men and one woman, to compete in three sports. Among the Yemeni athletes, judoka Ali Khousrof only made his second consecutive Olympic appearance. Taekwondo jin and 2011 Pan Arab Games champion Tameem Al-Kubati was the nation's flag bearer at the opening ceremony. Yemen, however, has yet to win its first ever Olympic medal.

Athletics

Yemen has selected 2 athletes by a wildcard.

Men

Women

Judo

Taekwondo

Yemen was given a wild card entrant.

References

Nations at the 2012 Summer Olympics
2012
Summer Olympics